is the fifth major studio album by Gentouki, released on September 21, 2016. The album has the official names Tanjoubi and Birth Day, meaning the day of being born, rather than the anniversary of birth. It includes a cover of the Kaoru Miyazaki song "Bye-Bye" and a bonus acoustic version of the single "Sutekina, Ano Hito". Tanjoubi is Gentouki's first release since the best-of album in 2007. This album, as well as past Gentouki albums, features artwork by illustrator Yusuke Nakamura.

Track listing
All words and music written by Jun Tanaka.

Personnel
Jun Tanaka – Guitar, vocals, Bass, drums
Atsushi Ideno – Percussion (Track 3, 6)
Kazuya Fukuzawa – Guitar (Track 5)
Tatsuhiko Yoshizawa – Trumpet(Track 5)
Yoshinari Takegami – Saxophone :  (Track 5, 7)
Nobuhide Handa – Trombone (Track 5)
Nero – Guitar (Track 6)
Azu and Kuma (From chocolate) – Backing vocals (Track 6)
Taiji Okuda – Mixing

References

External links
Official Gentouki website 
Tanjoubi special website

2016 albums